"4 Carats" is a song by American recording artist Kelly Clarkson, from her sixth studio album, Wrapped in Red (2013). Written by Clarkson, Cathy Dennis, Livvi Franc, with Greg Kurstin, who helmed the song's production. A Christmas pop song, "4 Carats" was originally written for Clarkson's seventh studio album that would have followed-up Wrapped in Red. Lyrically, the song explores the themes of holiday gift giving and materialism, with the singer asking Santa Claus for a four carat gemstone ring for Christmas day. Clarkson took inspirations from the songs "Santa Baby" (1953) and "Material Girl" (1984), sung by Eartha Kitt and Madonna, respectively, and described it as a crossover between the two.

Upon its release, "4 Carats" has received a mixed to positive reviews, who lauded the song's holiday pop sound but were ambivalent towards Clarkson singing a voluptuous number, due to her being a wholesome artist. Boosted by digital sales following Wrapped in Reds release, it entered the Billboard Holiday Digital Songs chart as an album cut at number 30 on the week ending November 16, 2013. It also charted on the South Korean Gaon International Singles Chart at number 144 on the week ending November 23, 2013.

Production and composition 
After releasing her first greatest hits album, Greatest Hits – Chapter One, Clarkson began to write material for her sixth studio album in December 2012, intending to be her first Christmas album. She collaborated with Greg Kurstin, who was set to produce the whole record, to co-write some of its original tracks. Kurstin had previously collaborated with Clarkson on her fifth studio album Stronger (2011) as well as Chapter One; and together, they wrote the songs "4 Carats" and "Underneath the Tree" for Wrapped in Red.

Clarkson and Kurstin co-wrote "4 Carats" with Cathy Dennis, Livvi Franc. Dennis had previously co-wrote "Before Your Love", which Clarkson released as her debut double-A side single in 2002 with "A Moment Like This"; while Franc had previously co-wrote "The War Is Over" for Stronger. Clarkson revealed that "4 Carats" was not originally written for Wrapped in Red, intending it to be recorded for a pop studio album that would have been a follow-up to Stronger. Clarkson had then changed its lyrics to fit with Wrapped in Reds Christmas themes. A Christmas pop song, the lyrics of "4 Carats" sings of materialism during the holiday season, in which a woman asks Santa Claus for a specific gift — a four carat (.8 gram) gemstone ring, which may be a diamond, or a ruby, something from Tiffany & Co. Clarkson described the song as a "kitschy" crossover between Eartha Kitt's "Santa Baby" (1953) and Madonna's "Material Girl" (1984), while Matt Casarino of PopMatters described the themes as "tongue-in-cheek".

Critical response 
Brandon Baker of Philadelphia noted that should "4 Carats" be removed of its Christmas-time lyrics, it easily have found a home on any standard Clarkson pop album. Slant Magazine's Sal Cinquemani described it as a ""Santa Baby"-by-way-of-"Since U Been Gone" rocker", and found it to be a track that provides a modern update on the proverbial Christmas-list song" Jon Sobel of the Seattle Post-Intelligencer remarked that "4 Carats" has a memorable pop hook. In his review, PopMatters' Matt Casarino wrote that Clarkson sounds too wholesome to effectively play a gold digger and that though the track has a nicely menacing guitar lick and a bouncy melody, Eartha Kitt can rest easy. Melinda Newman of HitFix described "4 Carats" as a song that wants to be a bit like "Santa Baby", and though it fits well with the lighthearted tone of Wrapped in Reds other originals, it suffers mildly in comparison.

Chart performance 
On the week ending November 16, 2013, "4 Carats" charted on the Billboard Holiday Digital Songs chart as an album cut at number 30. It also charted on the Gaon Singles Chart in South Korea at number 144 on the week ending November 23, 2013.

Credits and personnel 
Credits adapted from the Wrapped in Red liner notes.

Personnel

 Vocals – Kelly Clarkson
 Engineering – Jesse Shatkin, Alex Pasco
 Bass, engineering, guitar, drums, keyboards, production, and programming – Greg Kurstin

 Mixing – Serban Ghenea
 Engineered for mixing – John Hanes
 Songwriting – Cathy Dennis, Livvi Franc, and Greg Kurstin

Charts

References 

2013 songs
American Christmas songs
Kelly Clarkson songs
Songs written by Kelly Clarkson
Songs written by Cathy Dennis
Songs written by Livvi Franc
Songs written by Greg Kurstin
Song recordings produced by Greg Kurstin